The C-O sole (Pleuronichthys coenosus) is a species of flatfish in the family Pleuronectidae. Its native habitat is the temperate waters of the eastern Pacific, ranging from Sitka, Alaska in the north to San Quintín, Baja California in the south.

Nomenclature
The C-O sole gets its name from the markings on its caudal fin: a crescent shape and a ring, which resemble a letter C and a letter O.

Description
The C-O sole is a right-eyed flatfish with large, bulbous eyes located near the tip of the snout. The upper surface is mottled light to dark brown, with occasional white spots; there is usually a prominent mid-body dark spot with a pale patch behind it. The underside is light. There is a dark crescent-shaped marking and a large dark spot on the caudal fin, which together resemble the letters C and O.

Diet
The diet of the C-O sole consists mainly of zoobenthos polychaetes, bivalves and amphipods.

References

External links
 

Pleuronichthys
Western North American coastal fauna
Fish described in 1854